Major General Francis Plumley Derham,  (15 May 1885 – 22 October 1957) was an Australian solicitor and a senior officer in the Australian Army during the Second World War.

References

|-

1885 births
1957 deaths
Australian Companions of the Distinguished Service Order
Australian Companions of the Order of the Bath
Australian generals
Australian military personnel of World War I
Australian Army personnel of World War II
Australian solicitors
Military personnel from Melbourne
Recipients of the Croix de Guerre 1914–1918 (France)
University of Melbourne alumni